Le Commerce du Levant was a monthly economic magazine published in French language in Beirut, Lebanon, covering various aspect including economy, commerce, industry, tourism, banking and finance. It was in circulation between 1929 and 2021.

History and profile
Le Commerce du Levant was established in 1929 by Lebanese Jews. The headquarters was in Beirut. It was formerly published on a weekly basis. The magazine was published monthly by Société de presse et d’édition libanaise S.A.L. that also publishes the French Lebanese daily L'Orient-Le Jour. Nayla de Freige was the president-director general of the publication.

The magazine covered articles about business and commerce related to both Lebanon and the Middle East.

On 9 June 2021 the company announced that it would be shutting down its service, citing financial difficulties in the economic crisis. However, the real reason is believed to be due to the significant decline in readership. L'Orient le Jour, their sister site, would take in some of the staff.

References

External links
Official website

Business magazines
Defunct magazines published in Lebanon
French-language magazines
Magazines established in 1929
Magazines disestablished in 2021
Magazines published in Beirut
Monthly magazines published in Lebanon
Weekly magazines published in Lebanon
2021 disestablishments in Lebanon